The 1929 Fresno State Bulldogs football team represented Fresno State Normal School—now known as California State University, Fresno—during the 1929 college football season.

Fresno State competed in the Far Western Conference (FWC). The 1929 team was led by first-year head coach Stanley Borleske and played home games at Fresno State College Stadium on the campus of Fresno City College in Fresno, California. They finished with a record of one win and seven losses (1–7, 1–4 FWC). The Bulldogs were outscored by their opponents 40–250 for the season and were shut out in six of the eight games.

Schedule

Notes

References

Fresno State
Fresno State Bulldogs football seasons
Fresno State Bulldogs football